The Bell at Sealey Head is a 2008 fantasy novel by American writer Patricia A. McKillip. It was nominated for the 2009 Locus Award as well as the 2009 Mythopoeic Fantasy Award for Adult Literature.

Plot summary
The small ocean town of Sealey Head has long been haunted by a phantom bell that tolls as evening falls. The sound is so common that many of the town's inhabitants do not even notice it, let alone questions its existence. Ridley Dow, a scholar from the city, comes to investigate the mystery, and sets up residence at the old inn owned by a young man named Judd and his ailing father. To aid Ridley, Judd enlists the help of his friend and love-interest Gwyneth, a young woman who writes her own stories to explain the bell.

On the other side of town is the ancient manor Aislinn House, whose owner, Lady Eglantine, lies dying. Emma, a servant in the house, is able to open doors that lead not into another room, but into another world. On the other side of Aislinn House's doors is castle where the princess Ysabo moves through her daily rituals, tasks that Ysabo hates and does not understand, but cannot question. While Emma and Ysabo are able to speak to one another, neither has ever tried to cross into the other's realm.

When Lady Eglantine's heir Miranda Beryl comes to Aislinn House, Sealey Head's secrets begin to reveal themselves, sometimes with dangerous consequences. Miranda brings to Sealey Head an entourage of friends from the city, as well as a strange assistant. As the town gets pulled deeper into the strange magic that Ridley, Judd, Gwyneth, and Emma uncover, Ridley breaches the border between Aislinn House and Ysabo's world. It is only when the bell's location and owner are discovered that Aislinn House and all of Sealey Head are able to return to safety.

Nominations
2009 Mythopoeic Fantasy Award for Adult Literature Finalist
2009 Locus Award

References

2008 American novels
American fantasy novels
Books with cover art by Kinuko Y. Craft
Novels by Patricia A. McKillip
Ace Books books